Martin H. Brinkley (born 1966) is a lawyer. He is the 14th Dean and the William R. Kenan Jr. Distinguished Professor at the School of Law of the University of North Carolina.

Early life and education

Brinkley was born in Raleigh, North Carolina and attended local public schools. After preparing for college at Phillips Exeter Academy, he earned an A.B. in Classics in three years from Harvard University, graduating summa cum laude and Phi Beta Kappa.  He was Latin Orator for Harvard's 336th Commencement Exercises in 1987.

After graduate study in papyrology at the University of Cologne's Institute for Ancient Studies, Brinkley enrolled at the University of North Carolina School of Law.  He earned a J.D. degree in 1992, serving as Executive Articles Editor of the North Carolina Law Review.  He was admitted to practice in North Carolina that year.

Career

Brinkley began his career by serving as a law clerk to Chief Judge Sam J. Ervin, III of the United States Court of Appeals for the Fourth Circuit. He then entered the practice of law in Raleigh, North Carolina, first with Moore & Van Allen, PLLC, where he became a partner in 1998, and from 2003 to 2015, with Smith, Anderson, Blount, Dorsett, Mitchell & Jernigan, LLP.

During his 22 years at the bar, Brinkley practiced primarily in the fields of corporate law, mergers and acquisitions, antitrust and regulated industries, public finance and charitable organizations law. He was counsel to clients in the manufacturing, distribution, food and beverage, and insurance industries.

Dean of the University of North Carolina School of Law

Brinkley is the first person since the nineteenth century to become dean of the UNC School of Law (founded 1845) directly from private practice.  He joined the university in July 2015. Under his leadership, bar examination passage rates and student employment percentages have placed the law school among the top 15 schools in the country, and rankings of the school by media organizations have increased.

Community service and honors 

Brinkley has served on the boards of or acted as pro bono counsel to many nonprofit institutions with charitable, religious, artistic and educational missions, such as the North Caroliniana Society, the North Carolina Symphony, and Saint Mary's School.  For seventeen years (2004–21) he was Vice Chancellor of the Episcopal Diocese of North Carolina, and succeeded Edward L. Embree III as Chancellor of the Diocese in November 2021, becoming the principal legal adviser to the Right Reverend Samuel Sewall Rodman III, XII Bishop of North Carolina, and various diocesan institutions.  He is a former senior warden, junior warden and vestry member at Christ Church, Raleigh.

In 2011–2012 Brinkley served as president of the North Carolina Bar Association. He is an elected member of the American Law Institute and an honorary Master of the Bench of the Honourable Society of the Middle Temple.  In 2017, he received the North Carolina Bar Association's H. Brent McKnight Renaissance Lawyer Award, which recognizes "those North Carolina attorneys whose trustworthiness, respectful and courteous treatment of all people, enthusiasm for intellectual achievement and commitment to excellence in work, and service to the profession and community during a multi-faceted, accomplished life, inspire others."

Personal life

Brinkley is a classical musician, performing as a pianist and an oboist.  He is a student of Keisuke Wakao, Assistant Principal Oboe of the Boston Symphony Orchestra and Principal Oboe of the Boston Pops.  He previously studied with Joseph Robinson, Principal Oboe of the New York Philharmonic (1977-2005).

References

External links
Martin Brinkley chosen as 14th Dean of School of Law

1966 births
Living people
People from Raleigh, North Carolina
University of Cologne alumni
Phillips Exeter Academy alumni
University of North Carolina School of Law alumni
Deans of law schools in the United States
21st-century American lawyers
University of North Carolina School of Law faculty
20th-century American lawyers
American expatriates in Germany
Harvard College alumni
North Carolina lawyers
American university and college faculty deans